Ferdinando Dominick Bello, known as Freddie Bell, (September 29, 1931 – February 10, 2008), was an American musician, whose group, Freddie Bell and the Bellboys, were influential in the development of rock and roll in the 1950s. He was a prominent performer with the group on the Las Vegas Strip in the 1950s and 1960s, and continued to perform in Las Vegas into his later years after the demise of the group.

Biography
Bell was born in Philadelphia, Pennsylvania to Italian American parents, who were shopkeepers. He grew up in New Jersey. He became a trombonist, bassist, drummer, and singer, playing in various bands including that of Ernie Ventura.  In 1952 he formed his own group, the Bellboys, with Jack Kane (saxophone), Frankie Brent (bass / guitar), Russ Conti (piano), Chick Keeney (drums), and Jerry Mayo (trumpet). They were one of the first white groups to play the R&B hits of the day, and honed their act in the Midwest before landing a booking at the Sands Hotel and Casino in Las Vegas. 

In 1955, the group made their first recordings for the Teen Records label, including a cover version of Leiber and Stoller's "Hound Dog" (first recorded by Big Mama Thornton).  When performing the song in Las Vegas, they were seen by Elvis Presley, who was impressed and decided to record the song himself. Freddie Bell and the group became closely associated with Las Vegas in the 1950s and 1960s, performing regularly at The Sands, the Desert Inn, the Sahara Hotel, the Flamingo Hotel and other venues. The group were later joined by Roberta Linn, who was married to Bell from 1961 to 1973.
He continued to perform in Las Vegas into his later years after the demise of the group in the mid 1960s.

Bell’s last recording was Those Were The Nights (2006), a tribute song written by Richard Friedland and Ray Stribe which showcased Las Vegas legends Babe Pier, Carme and Peter Anthony along with Freddie. 

Freddie Bell was married four times and had six children (Angela, Fred, Lisa, Debbie, Andrew, and Marianna) and a stepson.  

Freddie Bell died, aged 76, on the 10th of February 2008. He is buried in Palm Memorial Park, Las Vegas.

References

American rock musicians
Musicians from Philadelphia
1931 births
2008 deaths
American people of Italian descent